Patrick John Conacher (born May 1, 1959) is a Canadian former ice hockey forward. He last played with the Canada men's national ice hockey team during the 1997-98 season. He is currently a scout of amateur hockey for the Vancouver Canucks.

Conacher who was born in Edmonton, Alberta, started his National Hockey League (NHL) career with the New York Rangers in 1980. He also played for the Edmonton Oilers, New Jersey Devils, Los Angeles Kings, Calgary Flames, and New York Islanders. He left the NHL after the 1996 season. He won the Stanley Cup in 1984 with the Edmonton Oilers.

Conacher was the first player in NHL history to complete the Hudson River triple, by serving as a member of the Rangers, Islanders and Devils franchises.

On July 26, 2011, he was named the new head coach of the WHL's Regina Pats, a position he held until August 2013 when he accepted the position as the General Manager for the Utica Comets of the AHL.

Family
On March 4, 2014, following the trade of Roberto Luongo to the Florida Panthers, Conacher's son, Pat Conacher, Jr., was employed as a back-up goaltender by the Vancouver Canucks in an NHL game against the Phoenix Coyotes.

Pat Conacher is not related to the family of Lionel Conacher.

Awards and achievements
1983–84 - NHL - Stanley Cup (Edmonton)

Career statistics

Regular season and playoffs

References

External links

1959 births
Living people
Arizona Coyotes coaches
Billings Bighorns players
Calgary Flames players
Canadian ice hockey centres
Canadian people of Scottish descent
Edmonton Oilers players
Los Angeles Kings players
New Jersey Devils players
New York Islanders players
New York Rangers draft picks
New York Rangers players
Nova Scotia Oilers players
Regina Pats coaches
Saskatoon Blades players
Ice hockey people from Edmonton
Springfield Indians players
Stanley Cup champions
Toronto Maple Leafs scouts
Utica Devils players
Canadian ice hockey coaches
Anaheim Ducks announcers